Luise Fastenrath (10 March 1858 – 28 March 1914), also known by the pen name Luise von Asten, was a Hungarian-born writer and translator.

She was born to a Jewish family in Zombor, the younger sister of Anna Forstenheim. In 1883, she converted to Catholicism and married  writer Johannes Fastenrath at the Augustinian Church in Vienna. She founded the Fastenrath Foundation soon after her husband's death in 1908.

Fastenrath translated numerous works into German from Spanish, Catalan, and French, including José Echegaray's drama Vida alegre y muerte triste.

References

1858 births
1914 deaths
Converts to Roman Catholicism from Judaism
Spanish–German translators
Translators from Catalan
French–German translators
German Jews
Writers from Sombor
Writers from Cologne
19th-century German women writers
19th-century German writers
19th-century translators